Cao Dewang (born May 1946), also known as Cho Tak Wong or Tak Wong Cho, is a Chinese entrepreneur. He is the chairman of Fuyao Group, one of the largest glass manufacturers in the world. He is also a member of the Chinese People's Consultative Conference from Fujian, and chairman of both the China Automobile Glass Association and the Fujian Golf Players' Association.

Early life 
Cao was born in 1946 in Fuqing into a wealthy Fujianese family.

Business career 
In 1983, while working as a sales manager in a glass factory which produced glass for water meters, Cao saved enough money to buy out the factory. In 1985, he saw Japanese automakers bringing their manufacturing to China, and as a result, Cao directed his factory to begin producing automotive glass. In 1987, he established the Fuyao Group and in 1993 the company was listed on the Shanghai Stock Exchange.

In 2009, Cao was named Ernst & Young World Entrepreneur Of The Year.

His brother Cao Degan was the vice governor of Fujian province from 1998 to 2003. 

In March 2005, his son took over Fuyao Group as the chief executive, while Cao retains the chairmanship. In the 2019 documentary American Factory, Cao is followed as he tours his new American addition to Fuyao. While overseeing the growth of his company in America, Cao leads fellow native Chinese to help grow the company in America. Nearly 200 workers moved to America leaving their lives behind to help grow Fuyao. Upon the new American factory opening, American workers pushed to unionize the factory claiming unsafe work conditions and unfair pay.

Philanthropy 
Cao is one of China's biggest philanthropists. He cites Andrew Carnegie, an American industrialist and philanthropist, as one of the main inspirations behind his charity work. He established the Heren Foundation, to which he has donated 300 million shares of his company. In 2012, he donated US$580 million to charity. He is quoted as saying that the more money he gives away, the less need he has for the money. He would rather share with others and educate children.

Personal life
Cao is a devout Buddhist. He authored an autobiography titled A Heart like Bodhi which was published in 2014. He is married to Chen Fengying, with whom he has three children; Cao Hui, Cao Yanping, and Cao Daiteng.

References

1946 births
Living people
Businesspeople from Fuzhou
Billionaires from Shanghai
People from Fuqing
Chinese company founders
Businesspeople from Shanghai
Billionaires from Fujian
Members of the 12th Chinese People's Political Consultative Conference